Lords of the Realm III (also known as Lords 3) is a medieval themed real-time strategy computer game published in March 2004 by Sierra Entertainment, a subsidiary of Vivendi Universal Games. It is the third installment in the Lords of the Realm series, and the last game made by Impressions Games.

Gameplay
At the start of a game, the player must choose a noble by either selecting one of the default nobles or creating a new one. Nobles act as user accounts within the game, wherein completed campaigns and saved games are local to each noble. A noble consists of three customizable features: housename, portrait, and heraldry.

Once a noble is selected, the player can choose to play a campaign or battle map, or load a saved game. While all the battle maps are available when a noble is created, the campaigns require that the player complete each level in sequence. The game has four campaigns, each with several scenarios.

Battle maps
In a battle map, the player is placed in a battlefield and is provided with predefined companies of soldiers available to them. The only victory condition of these battles is to defeat all enemy companies. The gameplay is consistent with that of the battle mode in the campaigns.

Layers
Except for the tutorials, campaigns consist of three layers of gameplay: the strategy layer, the diplomacy layer, and the battle layer.  The layers allow the player to control different components of the game.

Strategy layer and vassalage
The strategy layer allows the player to see a large overview of the lands to command their armies and assign vassals to the lands they possess.  The land that the player possesses is subdivided into parcels.  The player must assign a vassal to each parcel to manage the land for them.

There are several different types of parcels that dictate what they will produce.  Furthermore, each parcel is of a certain quality which determines how fast they will upgrade their land and produce units.  The different categories of vassals are as follows:

 Knight - Builds a fort on a parcel, which will produce a company of a certain type that is based on the knight.

 Priest - A priest will build a church on a parcel which increase the player's Christianity level.

 Burgher - A burgher builds a city on their designated parcel that produces gold to be spent on upgrades to the player's castle or hiring mercenaries.

 Serf - Serfs build farmlands on parcels that supply the armies with food.

Diplomacy layer
In the diplomacy screen, the player may assess his progress and the progress of the other nobles as well as engage in politics such as trade, war declarations, and forming alliances.  The diplomacy screen shows a diplomatic map of all the lands, colored by the nobles who own them, that displays parcel usage, army locations, and territorial control.  The player can view their chivalry, Christianity, and honor levels, and their progress in obtaining the next level in each of them.

Battle layer
The battle layer engages the player in the battlefield, allowing them to manually control their companies.

Reception

Lords of the Realm III received "mixed" reviews according to the review aggregation website Metacritic. A common complaint was, relative to its predecessors, the simplification of province management and the departure from the turn-based strategy map.

Lords of the Realm III was a runner-up for Computer Games Magazines 2004 "Best Budget Game" award, but lost to The Political Machine.

References

External links

2004 video games
Real-time strategy video games
Video game sequels
Video games developed in the United Kingdom
Video games set in medieval England
Video games set in France
Video games set in Germany
Windows games
Windows-only games
Impressions Games games
Sierra Entertainment games
Multiplayer and single-player video games